ChemWindow is a  chemical structure drawing molecule editor and publishing program now published by John Wiley & Sons as of 2020, originally developed by Bio-Rad Laboratories, Inc. It was first developed by SoftShell International in the 1990s. Bio-Rad acquired this technology in 1996 and eventually made it part of their KnowItAll software product line, offering a specific ChemWindow edition of their software for structure drawing and publishing. They have also incorporated ChemWindow structure drawing components into their KnowItAll spectroscopy software packages with their DrawIt, ReportIt, and MineIt tools.

Features 

 2D chemical structure drawing (includes stereochemical recognition)
 Scientific publishing / reporting tools 
 3D ViewIt Input and visualization of 3D structures
 Portal with useful links for user community
 3D presentations and 3D modeling, plus calculation of bond lengths, angles, etc.
 Build databases with structures and chemical property information
 Database searching (search structures and properties) 
 Data plotting and visualization 
 Laboratory Glassware Collection to document your experiments. 
 Chemical Engineering Collection for realistic process flow diagrams 
 Calculators for a) easy mole-to-mass conversion, b) calculation of mass from structure 
 Mass Fragmentation Tool
 Multiple interface languages (English, Chinese, Japanese, German, French)
DEA Controlled Substance Prediction and Structure Classification

References 

 Givan, Ray, "Quick on the Draw" "Scientific Computing World", Cambridge, UK, September, 2000. 
 Joyce, John  "Pittcon 2005 Informatics Review" "Scientific Computing" Rockaway, NJ, April, 2005. Retrieved 14 November 2012.

External links 
 ChemWindow home page
 archived ChemWindow Home Page

Chemistry software
Windows software